Ignacius Augustinus Schetz de Grobbendonk (1625–1680) was the 9th Bishop of Namur and the 11th Bishop of Ghent.

Life
Schetz de Grobbendonck was a son of Anthonie II Schetz and his second wife Maria van Malsen, lady of Tilburg. After graduating licentiate of civil and canon law, he was appointed in 1647 to a canonry of Tournai Cathedral. His older sister was abbess of La Cambre. He went on to serve as archdeacon and vicar general of Tournai.

In 1666 he was named bishop of Roermond, but never took possession of the see, being named instead to the diocese of Namur the following year. He was consecrated bishop in Antwerp on 12 May 1669. In 1679 he was translated to Ghent, dying there on 31 May 1680. He was buried in his cathedral.

See also
Catholic Church in Belgium

References

1625 births
1680 deaths
Bishops of Namur
Bishops of Ghent
Ursel
Canons (priests)
17th-century Roman Catholic bishops in the Holy Roman Empire